Ladybrand Commando was a light infantry regiment of the South African Army. It formed part of the South African Army Infantry Formation as well as the South African Territorial Reserve.

History

Origin

Operations

With the Orange Free State Republic

During the Anglo Boer War
Elements of this commando were engaged at the battle of Magersfontein in 11 December 1899.

Surrender
On the morning of 30 July 1900, General Hunter received the surrender of Commandants Prinsloo and Crowther and of the Ficksburg and Ladybrand commandos. The surrender took place on what would become known as 'Surrender Hill in the Brandwater Basin.

With the UDF
By 1902 all Commando remnants were under British military control and disarmed.

By 1912, however previous Commando members could join shooting associations.

By 1940, such commandos were under control of the National Reserve of Volunteers.

These commandos were formally reactivated by 1948.

With the SADF
During this era, the commando was mainly used for air force protection, cordon and search operations, as well as stock theft control assistance to the rural police.

The Commando was also involved in border protection with Lesotho.

The unit resorted under the command of the SADF's Group 36.

With the SANDF

Disbandment
This unit, along with all other Commando units was disbanded after a decision by South African President Thabo Mbeki to disband all Commando Units. The Commando system was phased out between 2003 and 2008 "because of the role it played in the apartheid era", according to the Minister of Safety and Security Charles Nqakula.

Unit Insignia

Leadership

References

See also 
 South African Commando System

Infantry regiments of South Africa
South African Commando Units